The 1881 Georgetown football team represented the Georgetown University during the 1881 college football season.  Georgetown's official records do not include any games prior to 1887, however media guides prior to 1950 included this season's result.  Despite issuing a challenge to Georgetown, the Alexandria High School team did not appear for the game, resulting in a forfeit.  This marks the only win credited to Georgetown against Alexandria High School, as match-ups in 1887 and 1888 resulted in defeats for Georgetown.

Schedule

References

Georgetown
Georgetown Hoyas football seasons
College football undefeated seasons
Georgetown football